Wancerzów  is a village in the administrative district of Gmina Mstów, within Częstochowa County, Silesian Voivodeship, in southern Poland, near Wanceland.

The village has a population of 585.

References

Villages in Częstochowa County